"Ride Darkhorse, Ride" is the first single by Canadian power metal band 3 Inches of Blood. It was released on May 5, 2003 by Megarock Records. "Onward to Valhalla '03" and "Tonight we Rejoice '03" are re-recordings of songs from the band's debut EP, Sect of the White Worm. The cover art was illustrated by Martin McKenna and derives from a gamebook entitled Legend of the Shadow Warriors, by Stephen Hand.

Track listing
 "Ride Darkhorse, Ride" – 3:27 
 "Onward to Valhalla '03" – 3:09 
 "Tonight We Rejoice '03" – 2:33

Legacy
"Ride Darkhorse, Ride" was re-recorded two years later for inclusion on the band's second studio album, Advance and Vanquish, though it ultimately was not featured in the finalized track listing. This re-recorded version has yet to be released.

Personnel
 Cam Pipes – clean vocals
 Jamie Hooper – screaming vocals
 Sunny Dhak – lead guitar
 Bobby Froese – rhythm guitar
 Rich Trawick – bass
 Geoff Trawick – drums
 Jesse Gander – producer

2003 singles
3 Inches of Blood songs